Mihkel Mathiesen (27 October 1918 – 28 November 2003) was an Estonian statesman.

Mihkel Mathiesen was born in Pärivere, Are Parish (now, Tori Parish), Pärnu County. He was Estonian Minister of Communications in exile from 5 June 1985 to 20 June 1990 and Minister of Economic Affairs in exile from 20 June 1990 to 15 September 1992.

On 16 July 1992 he voted against abolition of the government in exile and on 15 September of the same year he assumed presidency  (Prime Minister in the capacity of the President of the Republic) and appointed a new government.

Mihkel Mathiesen was succeeded on his death by Kalev Ots.

References

External links
 Obituary (in Estonian) 

1918 births
2003 deaths
Tallinn University of Technology alumni
Estonian World War II refugees
Estonian emigrants to Sweden
People from Tori Parish
20th-century Estonian politicians